Bleeding Cool is an Internet news site, focusing on comics, television, film, board games, and video games. Owned by Avatar Press, it was launched by Rich Johnston on March 27, 2009. Avatar Press also publishes an associated magazine, Bleeding Cool.

Content
Among Bleeding Cool's features are a power list detailing the most influential people in the comics industry.

In 2012, Bleeding Cool covered sexual harassment accusations leveled against DC Comics editor Eddie Berganza, beginning with an incident at WonderCon in Anaheim, California. Though that initial article was a blind item that did not name the victim or accused, four years later, Bleeding Cool named Berganza when it accused him of sexual harassment, and detailed how he had risen in the ranks at DC even after the accusations became known to his employers. This was followed by a November 2017 BuzzFeed report on accusations leveled against Berganza by several women that led to his termination from DC.

In November 2017, Bleeding Cool broke the story that writer/editor C.B. Cebulski, who had recently been promoted to Editor-in-Chief of Marvel Comics, had written a number of Japanese-themed stories for Marvel in 2003 and 2004 under the pseudonym Akira Yoshida, which led to accusations of cultural appropriation, yellowfacing, and "Orientalist profiteering".

Contributors 
The site has published regular work by writers including:
 Warren Ellis
 Si Spurrier
 Alex de Campi
 Dennis O'Neil
 Michael Davis
 Jude Terror
 Patrick Dane
 Dan Wickline
 Adi Tantimedh
 Brendon Connelly
 Kaitlyn Booth
 Jeremy Konrad
 Mary Anne Butler
 Bill Watters
 Ray Flook
 Madeline Ricchiuto
 Gavin Sheehan
 Lauren Michele
 Val Hochberg – creator of Mystery Babylon
 Hannah Means-Shannon – now editor at Heavy Metal Magazine
 Chris D'Lando – now C2E2 Administrator
 Donny Cates – now writer of Venom, Redneck, God Country, Thanos, Doctor Strange, and Thor. 
 Andrew Wheeler – now Editor-in-Chief of Comics Alliance
 Joel Ronson – the son of Jon Ronson
 Derek Des Anges – movie reviewer
 Rod Lamberti – comic store owner

Awards and accolades 
Bleeding Cool was nominated for the "Favourite Comics Related Website" Eagle Award in 2010 and 2011 and won in 2012. It was named as one of PC Magazine's top blogs of 2010 and Technorati gave it a perfect 1000 score for influence in the comics category in 2011. Johnston was awarded the Shel Dorf Award for Best Comics Blogger for his work on Bleeding Cool in 2012. He was also nominated in 2011 and 2013.

References

External links

American entertainment news websites
Websites about comics
Internet forums
Internet properties established in 2009